Karl-Henning Rehren (born 1956 in Celle) is a German physicist who focuses on algebraic quantum field theory.

Biography 
Rehren studied physics in Heidelberg, Paris and Freiburg. In Freiburg he received his PhD (advisor Klaus Pohlmeyer) in 1984. Habilitation 1991 in Berlin. Since 1997 he teaches physics in Göttingen.

He became notable outside his field, especially among string theorists, in 1999 when he discovered the Algebraic holography (also called Rehren duality), a relation between quantum field theories AdSd+1 and conformal quantum field theories on d-dimensional Minkowski spacetime, which is similar in scope to the Holographic principle. This work has no direct relation to the more well known Maldacena duality, but refers to the more general statement of the AdS/CFT correspondence by Edward Witten. It is generally accepted that the relation found by Rehren does not provide a proof for Witten's conjecture and is thus considered an independent result.

Selected publications

See also 

 AdS/CFT correspondence
 Axiomatic quantum field theory
 Conformal field theory
 Local quantum physics
 Quantum field theory
 Rehren duality

References

External links 
 .
 .
 Author page on INSPIRE-HEP
 
 

1956 births
Living people
20th-century German physicists
Heidelberg University alumni
University of Paris alumni
University of Freiburg alumni
Academic staff of the University of Göttingen
People from Celle
21st-century German physicists